Dylan Walsh (born Charles Hunter Walsh; November 17, 1963) is an American actor. He is best known for his role as Dr. Sean McNamara in the FX television series Nip/Tuck, Al Burns in Unforgettable and Sam Lane in Superman & Lois.

Early life
Walsh was born Charles Hunter Walsh in Los Angeles, California. His maternal grandfather, Frank P. Haven, was a managing editor of the Los Angeles Times. His parents worked for the Foreign Service—they met in Ethiopia. As a result, Walsh lived in Kenya, India, Pakistan, and Indonesia as a child. His family returned to the United States when he was ten years old and settled in Virginia, where Walsh began acting in high school. He graduated from the University of Virginia in 1986 with a degree in English. After graduating from college, Walsh moved to New York City to act professionally.

Career
Walsh's first role was in a television movie called Soldier Boys with James Earl Jones. He then landed a role in the movie Loverboy and a regular role on the television series Kate & Allie. In 1989, he started using the name Dylan Walsh professionally. He continued to work in films including Betsy's Wedding, Nobody's Fool, Congo, The Stepfather, and Secretariat and guest starred the television series Brooklyn South, The Twilight Zone, and Everwood.

In 2003, Walsh landed the role of Sean McNamara on the FX television series Nip/Tuck, after being approached by series creator Ryan Murphy in a coffee shop. Murphy remembered him from his roles in Nobody's Fool and in a television movie.

Walsh starred as Lieutenant Al Burns in all four seasons of CBS's crime-drama series Unforgettable, which ran from 2011 to 2016.

In April 2020, Walsh was cast as Sam Lane, the father of Lois Lane, on The CW action-superhero series Superman & Lois.

Personal life
Walsh was married from 1996 to 2003 to actress Melora Walters, with whom he had two children, Thomas Walsh born in 1996 and Joanna Walsh born in 1997. After the couple divorced, Walsh married actress Joanna Going on October 10, 2004, and the two have a daughter, Stella Walsh, who was born in 2003. In 2010 Walsh announced he filed for divorce. Walsh met Leslie Bourque and had a daughter, Amelie Belle, and a son, Hudson Scott. Walsh and Bourque were married June 3, 2022 in New Orleans, LA.  Bourque is now Leslie Walsh.

Filmography

References

External links
 

1963 births
Living people
American male film actors
American male television actors
Male actors from Los Angeles
University of Virginia alumni
20th-century American male actors
21st-century American male actors
Male actors from Virginia
American expatriates in Kenya
American expatriates in Pakistan
American expatriates in India
American expatriates in Indonesia